Finnlay Withington (born 3 April 2004 in Bury) is an English professional squash player. As of November 2022, he was ranked number 171 in the world.

References

2004 births
Living people
English male squash players